Charles Mader may refer to:

 Charles L. Mader (1930–2018), American physical chemist
 Charles Uniacke Mader (1856–1929), merchant and political figure in Nova Scotia, Canada